Duchess of Cornwall is a courtesy title used by the wife of the eldest son and heir of the British monarch. The current title-holder is Catherine (née Middleton).

Duchesses of Cornwall

Until her husband's accession to the throne, Camilla, the second wife of Charles III, used the title 'Duchess of Cornwall' rather than 'Princess of Wales', as the latter was still popularly associated with Charles's first wife, Diana, who died in 1997.

Literary references
 Arthurian legend depicts Cornwall with its own ducal family. Notably, King Arthur's mother, Igraine, would have been Duchess of Cornwall from her first marriage to Duke Gorlois; in some stories, the title is then passed on to their daughter, Morgan le Fay. 
Shakespeare's King Lear includes the character "Regan, Duchess of Cornwall", Lear's second daughter.

See also

Duke of Cornwall
Duchy of Cornwall

References

External links
Official website
BBC News report

 
British monarchy
Duchy of Cornwall